Round Island, is a private island, located within Buckeye Lake, in Fairfield County, Ohio.  In the 1920s, a cottage was built on the island, and in 1995 it was purchased and renovated by the late Dave Thomas, CEO and founder of Wendy's restaurants.

References 

Landforms of Fairfield County, Ohio
Lake islands of Ohio
Private islands of Ohio